The Faculty of Medicine of Sousse or FMS, is a Tunisian university establishment created according to the law N°74-83 of December 11, 1974. Part of the University of Sousse.

History 
The faculty of medicine of Sousse including the faculty of medicine of Sfax was the first faculty established outside of Tunis. It is also the first higher education establishment located in Sousse, in the Tunisian Center.

Its first mission was the creation of opened environment and prepare its future doctors for internal medicine trainings according to an approach which is both curative and preventive. Also a community medicine department was created within the first year.

See also 
 Medicine School of Tunis
 Faculty of Medicine of Monastir
 Faculty of Medicine of Sfax
 University of Sousse

References

External links 
 Official website

Universities in Tunisia
Establishments in Tunisia